is a full-time Japanese school, is in Sangkat Toek Thla in Sen Sok Section.

History
Prior to the school's establishment, there was an increased number of Japanese families with children in Cambodia that occurred after the growth of Japanese business operations. In 2013 the Japanese Business Association of Cambodia established a committee for making a day school. It was established in 2015, with 14 teachers and 21 students upon opening. It is the first full Japanese day school in Cambodia.

References

Further reading

External links
 Japanese School of Phnom Penh

International schools in Phnom Penh
Nihonjin gakkō in Asia
2015 establishments in Cambodia
Educational institutions established in 2015